Peter Smyth was a politician.

Peter or Pete Smyth may also refer to:

Peter Smyth (footballer), see 1991–92 Manchester United F.C. season
Pete Smyth (musician), member of Mugstar
Peter Smyth (equestrian), see 2012 FEI Nations Cup Promotional League

See also
Peter Smyth House,  a historic house in Fayetteville, Arkansas
Peter Smythe (disambiguation)
Peter Smith (disambiguation)